Studenets is the name of several  rural localities in Russia.

Bryansk Oblast
As of 2010, two rural localities in Bryansk Oblast bear this name:
Studenets, Pochepsky District, Bryansk Oblast, a settlement in Tretyakovsky Selsoviet of Pochepsky District
Studenets, Rognedinsky District, Bryansk Oblast, a village in Voronovsky Selsoviet of Rognedinsky District

Ivanovo Oblast
As of 2010, two rural localities in Ivanovo Oblast bear this name:
Studenets, Gavrilovo-Posadsky District, Ivanovo Oblast, a village in Gavrilovo-Posadsky District
Studenets, Zavolzhsky District, Ivanovo Oblast, a village in Zavolzhsky District

Kaluga Oblast
As of 2010, one rural locality in Kaluga Oblast bears this name:
Studenets, Kaluga Oblast, a selo in Zhizdrinsky District

Kirov Oblast
As of 2010, one rural locality in Kirov Oblast bears this name:
Studenets, Kirov Oblast, a village under the administrative jurisdiction of Oktyabrsky City District of the city of Kirov

Komi Republic
As of 2010, one rural locality in the Komi Republic bears this name:
Studenets, Komi Republic, a settlement in Studenets Administrative Territory of Ust-Vymsky District

Kostroma Oblast
As of 2010, one rural locality in Kostroma Oblast bears this name:
Studenets, Kostroma Oblast, a village in Klevantsovskoye Settlement of Ostrovsky District

Republic of Mordovia
As of 2010, one rural locality in the Republic of Mordovia bears this name:
Studenets, Republic of Mordovia, a selo in Studenetsky Selsoviet of Zubovo-Polyansky District

Nizhny Novgorod Oblast
As of 2010, one rural locality in Nizhny Novgorod Oblast bears this name:
Studenets, Nizhny Novgorod Oblast, a village in Novolikeyevsky Selsoviet of Kstovsky District

Oryol Oblast
As of 2010, one rural locality in Oryol Oblast bears this name:
Studenets, Oryol Oblast, a village in Podberezovsky Selsoviet of Mtsensky District

Penza Oblast
As of 2010, two rural localities in Penza Oblast bear this name:
Studenets, Kamensky District, Penza Oblast, a railway station in Fedorovsky Selsoviet of Kamensky District
Studenets, Narovchatsky District, Penza Oblast, a selo in Pleskovsky Selsoviet of Narovchatsky District

Pskov Oblast
As of 2010, two rural localities in Pskov Oblast bear this name:
Studenets, Nevelsky District, Pskov Oblast, a village in Nevelsky District
Studenets, Porkhovsky District, Pskov Oblast, a village in Porkhovsky District

Ryazan Oblast
As of 2010, four rural localities in Ryazan Oblast bear this name:
Studenets, Mikhaylovsky District, Ryazan Oblast, a village in Mishinsky Rural Okrug of Mikhaylovsky District
Studenets, Pronsky District, Ryazan Oblast, a village in Pogorelovsky Rural Okrug of Pronsky District
Studenets, Spassky District, Ryazan Oblast, a settlement in Isadsky Rural Okrug of Spassky District
Studenets, Zakharovsky District, Ryazan Oblast, a village in Polivanovsky Rural Okrug of Zakharovsky District

Smolensk Oblast
As of 2010, one rural locality in Smolensk Oblast bears this name:
Studenets, Smolensk Oblast, a village in Studenetskoye Rural Settlement of Shumyachsky District

Republic of Tatarstan
As of 2010, one rural locality in the Republic of Tatarstan bears this name:
Studenets, Republic of Tatarstan, a village in Verkhneuslonsky District

Tver Oblast
As of 2010, two rural localities in Tver Oblast bear this name:
Studenets, Ostashkovsky District, Tver Oblast, a village in Ostashkovsky District
Studenets, Zharkovsky District, Tver Oblast, a village in Zharkovsky District

Ulyanovsk Oblast
As of 2010, two rural localities in Ulyanovsk Oblast bear this name:
Studenets, Kuzovatovsky District, Ulyanovsk Oblast, a selo in Bezvodovsky Rural Okrug of Kuzovatovsky District
Studenets, Sursky District, Ulyanovsk Oblast, a selo under the administrative jurisdiction of Sursky Settlement Okrug of Sursky District

Vologda Oblast
As of 2010, one rural locality in Vologda Oblast bears this name:
Studenets, Vologda Oblast, a village in Rostilovsky Selsoviet of Gryazovetsky District

Yaroslavl Oblast
As of 2010, two rural localities in Yaroslavl Oblast bear this name:
Studenets, Pereslavsky District, Yaroslavl Oblast, a village in Lychensky Rural Okrug of Pereslavsky District
Studenets, Tutayevsky District, Yaroslavl Oblast, a village in Metenininsky Rural Okrug of Tutayevsky District